Amt Brück is an Amt ("collective municipality") in the district of Potsdam-Mittelmark, in Brandenburg, Germany. Its seat is in Brück.

The Amt Brück consists of the following municipalities:
Borkheide
Borkwalde
Brück
Golzow
Linthe
Planebruch

Demography

References 

Bruck
Potsdam-Mittelmark